Audition is the second solo studio album by American rapper P.O.S. It was released on Rhymesayers Entertainment in 2006. It peaked at number 45 on the Billboard Independent Albums chart.

Production
P.O.S titled the album "Audition" because he felt he was auditioning for a national audience for the first time, given that his only prior album, Ipecac Neat, had much smaller distribution. On his second album, he set out to make the "most abrasive possible sound" and "some of the songs difficult to listen to." Although the opening words of the album are "First of all, fuck Bush," P.O.S told The A.V. Club in 2006 that he did not see the album as "overtly political" so much as a social commentary.

P.O.S told City Pages in 2016 that the song "Paul Kersey to Jack Kimball" is about his uncle getting hit and killed by a car and its title is an allusion to the Death Wish film series. The song "P.O.S is Ruining My Life" contains an uncleared sample of an Underoath song; P.O.S had discovered them at Warped Tour before using the sample and later played lead guitar for them at Warped Tour.

Most of the production is credited to both P.O.S and his alias Emily Bloodmobile. Lazerbeak and MK Larada also provide production contributions as well. Guest appearances include Mike Mictlan, Slug, Greg Attonito, Craig Finn, and Maggie Morrison.

Critical reception

Marisa Brown of AllMusic gave the album 3.5 out of 5 stars, calling it "a very well-produced album, exciting and musical and intense."

Track listing

Personnel
Credits adapted from liner notes.

 P.O.S – vocals, guitar, bass guitar, synthesizer, production (1–3, 5, 7, 9–13, 16), executive production
 Greg Attonito – vocals (3)
 Lazerbeak – production (4, 6, 14, 15)
 Slug – vocals (5, 14), executive production
 Craig Finn – vocals (7)
 Maggie Morrison – vocals (8)
 MK Larada – production (8), art direction, design
 Mike Mictlan – vocals (12)
 Turbo Nemesis – turntables
 Tasha Baron – electric piano
 Jesse Greene – cello, violin
 Bitsy Hanson – cello
 Passions – vocals
 Joe Mabbott – vocals, recording, mixing
 Ian Campbell – vocals, recording, mixing
 B. Sayers – executive production
 Dan Monick – photography
 Jason Miller – photography
 Josh Syx – photography

Charts

References

External links
 
 Audition at Bandcamp

2006 albums
P.O.S albums
Rhymesayers Entertainment albums
Albums produced by Lazerbeak